Cunnawarra is a national park located in New South Wales, Australia,  east of Armidale,  off the Waterfall Way and  north of Sydney. The  Styx River Forest Way runs from the Point Lookout Road through Cunnawarra National Park to the Kempsey Road. The New England National Park adjoins the Cunnawarra National Park on the north-eastern boundary and the Oxley Wild Rivers National Park joins it on the southern corner.

The Park is part of the New England Group of the World Heritage Site Gondwana Rainforests of Australia inscribed in 1986 and added to the Australian National Heritage List in 2007.

Cunnawarra is home not only to the imposing eucalyptus trees (which are the tallest in NSW) but also to various endangered wildlife species. Here you can see glossy black cockatoos (Calyptorhynchus lathami), rufous scrub-birds (Atrichornis rufescens), powerful owls (Ninox strenua) and spotted-tailed quolls (Dasyurus maculatus).

See also
 Protected areas of New South Wales

References

National parks of New South Wales
Northern Tablelands
Protected areas established in 1999
Gondwana Rainforests of Australia
1999 establishments in Australia